Screen One is a British television anthology drama series, produced by the BBC and distributed by BBC Worldwide, that was transmitted on BBC One from 1989 to 1998. A total of six series were broadcast, incorporating sixty individual films, several of which were broadcast as stand-alone specials. The series was born following the demise of the BBC's Play for Today, which ran from 1970 to 1984. Producer Kenith Trodd was asked to formulate a new series of one-off television dramas, the result of which was Screen Two, which began broadcasting on BBC2 in 1985. However, while Play for Todays style had often been a largely studio-based form of theatre on television, Screen Two was shot entirely on film.

In 1989, the series was adapted for more mainstream audiences on BBC1, and Screen One was born to follow the lead taken by Channel 4, whose many television films had later been released in cinemas. Screen One attracted many names familiar to television and film audiences, including the likes of Peggy Ashcroft, Alfred Molina, Sean Bean, David Thewlis, Ray Winstone, Alan Bates, Judi Dench, James Fox, Keith Allen, Bob Peck, Alun Armstrong, Marina Sirtis, David Jason, Brenda Blethyn, James Bolam, Adrian Edmondson, Alison Steadman, Timothy West, Clive Russell, Janet McTeer and Michael Murphy. Several actors also made their on-screen debuts during the series, including Keira Knightley in the fifth series episode Royal Celebration. By 1993, the prevailing mood within the BBC was to move away from single dramas and concentrate production on series and serials, and as such, a reduced six-episode series, broadcast in 1994, was to be the last full-length series of Screen One, although a further eight one-off specials followed, with the final episode being broadcast on 15 February 1998.

Transmissions

Episodes

Series 1 (1989)

Series 2 (1990—1991)

Series 3 (1991—1992)

Series 4 (1992)

Series 5 (1993)

Series 6 (1994)

Specials (1995–1998)

References

External links

1980s British anthology television series
1990s British anthology television series
British drama television series
1989 British television series debuts
1998 British television series endings
1980s British drama television series
1990s British drama television series
BBC television dramas
English-language television shows